The Manila Times is the oldest extant English-language newspaper in the Philippines. It is published daily by The Manila Times Publishing Corp. (formerly La Vanguardia Publishing Corporation) with editorial and administrative offices at 2/F Sitio Grande Building, 409 A. Soriano Avenue, Intramuros, Manila.

It was founded on October 11, 1898, shortly after news that the Treaty of Paris would be signed, ending the Spanish–American War and transferring the Philippines from Spanish to American sovereignty. It presently bills itself as having the fourth-largest circulation of the newspapers in the Philippines, beating the Manila Standard, but still behind the Philippine Daily Inquirer, the Manila Bulletin and The Philippine Star.

The current president and chief executive officer (CEO) and executive editor is Dante Francis "Klink" Ang II. On May 1, 2017, its chairman emeritus Dante Ang was appointed by President Rodrigo Duterte as special envoy of the President for international public relations.

History 
The Manila Times was founded by Thomas Gowan, an Englishman who had been living in the Philippines. The paper was created to serve mainly the Americans who were sent to Manila to fight in the Spanish–American War. At the time, most of the newspapers in the Philippines were in Spanish and a few others were in the native languages. Shortly after the paper's founding, reports reached Manila about the Paris Conference that would lead to the treaty where Spain ceded its claim over the Philippines to the United States.

The first issue of The Manila Times on October 11, 1898 had a sheet of two leaves, or four pages, measuring about 12 by 8 inches, each page divided into two columns. The first page was taken up by announcements and advertisements. Page 2 was the editorial page. It contained the editorials and the more important news of the day. Page 3 was devoted to cable news from Europe and the United States all bearing on the Spanish–American War.

In 1899, George Sellner acquired The Manila Times from Gowan, who joined the paper as business manager.

In 1902, an American businessman acquired The Manila Times, reacquired by Sellner in 1905.

In 1907, Thomas C. Kinney acquired The Manila Times from Sellner.

On July 25, 1914, The Manila Times moved its headquarters from the Escolta Street to the Cosmopolitan Building.

In 1919, future Philippine President during the Commonwealth period Manuel L. Quezon acquired The Manila Times and he owned until 1921, when sugar magnate George Fairchild acquired the paper.

In 1926, Jacob Rosenthal acquired The Manila Times from Fairchild.

On December 10, 1928, the Cosmopolitan Building was destroyed by a fire and The Manila Times headquarters were moved to Intramuros.

On March 15, 1930, The Manila Times was shut down for the first time until 1945, when the paper re-opened after World War II and was later sold to Chino Roces.

By 1950, The Manila Times becomes the largest newspaper in the Philippines.

On September 23, 1972, President Ferdinand Marcos declared martial law with Proclamation No. 1081, he ordered the closure of media establishments throughout the country, including The Manila Times, it marks the second time the newspaper closed since 1945 and its owner Chino Roces arrested.

On February 5, 1986, The Manila Times re-opened, several days before the People Power Revolution that ousted Marcos and installed Corazon Aquino as president.

Chino Roces died on September 30, 1988 and in 1989, the paper was acquired by businessman John Gokongwei.

In 1999, The Manila Times faced controversy when  it published a story about President Joseph Estrada, who was described as an "unwitting godfather" in a deal between the National Power Corporation (NAPOCOR) and Argentine firm .

On March 9, 1999, Estrada filled a libel suit against The Manila Times, but the libel case withdraw one month later in April, and the libel case withdrawal triggered the resignation of the paper's editors and writers.

On July 20, 1999, The Manila Times was acquired by Katrina Legarda and Reghis Romero from Gokongwei and then shut down for the third time on July 23, 1999 and later re-opened on October 11, 1999.
On May 14, 2001, Mark Jimenez acquired the paper, until he sold to Dante Ang, a publicist for President Gloria Macapagal Arroyo on August 8, 2001.

2007 Times Person of the Year 
On December 30, 2007, The Manila Times chose Reynato Puno as "Times Person of the Year", chosen by all the newspaper's editors. Puno defeated 2nd choices OFW, Governor Eddie Panlilio, the Filipino Nurse, the DSWD social worker, the Pinoy Farmer, Manny Pacquiao and Joey de Venecia.

See also 
 Libertito Pelayo
 Filipino Reporter
 Satur Ocampo

References

External links 
 

 
English-language newspapers published in the Philippines
Publications established in 1898
National newspapers published in the Philippines
Newspapers published in Metro Manila
Companies based in Manila
Daily newspapers published in the Philippines